The 2020 Michigan Tech Huskies football team would have represented Michigan Tech University during the 2020 NCAA Division II football season. The Huskies were to compete as members of the Great Lakes Intercollegiate Athletic Conference (GLIAC) and play their home games at Kearly Stadium in Houghton, Michigan. This would be the program's fourth season under head coach Steve Olson. Instead, The GLIAC cancelled the season due to the ongoing COVID-19 Pandemic.

Previous season
The Huskies competed in the 2019 season, going 5–5, featuring wins over rival Northern Michigan and then-ranked Hillsdale.

Personnel

Coaching staff

Schedule

Source

References

Michigan Tech
Michigan Tech Huskies football seasons
Michigan Tech Huskies football